Dupci is a village in the municipality of Brus, Serbia. According to the 2002 census, the village has a population of 456 people.

References

Populated places in Rasina District